Mark Edwards (born 1970) is a London-based, best-selling fiction writer. His books have sold over four million copies and been translated into 12 languages. Edwards has written 13 thrillers since his 2013 debut The Magpies, and his novel No Place to Run made it into the top ten Kindle chart. His other novels include Follow You Home, The Retreat, In Her Shadow, Because She Loves Me, The Hollows and Here to Stay. He has co-authored six books with Louise Voss.

Early years 
Edwards was born in Kent, England, on 4 November 1970. He grew up in Hastings, East Sussex where he attended Rye College. He graduated from Staffordshire University in 1993 with a degree in sociology. While pursuing a career as a writer, Edwards worked for the civil service and did customer service for a rail franchise, and eventually a London-based book publisher. He also had a stint as an English teacher in Tokyo, Japan while pursuing his first publishing deal.

Professional life 
In 1999, Edwards appeared on BBC documentary "Close Up: First Writes,” which followed three writers, including Jake Arnott at the start of their writing careers. In 2011, Edwards self-published two novels co-authored by Louise Voss, Killing Cupid and Catch Your Death, the latter of which became the first novel by self-published authors to reach number one on the UK’s Amazon bestsellers list. This led to a four-book deal with HarperCollins. In 2013, Edwards published his debut solo novel, The Magpies, which reached number one and led to a deal with Thomas & Mercer, part of Amazon Publishing. His 2015 novel, Follow You Home, was a worldwide bestseller and has been optioned by CBS TV Studios, to be produced by Michael Allowitz. His 2019 novel Here to Stay received positive reviews, including one from critic Natasha Cooper who said, "Mark Edwards has sold millions of copies of his domestic suspense novels. On the evidence of Here to Stay, his latest, it is not hard to see why."

Self publishing 
When Amazon launched its successful ebook reader, the Kindle, in Britain in 2010, Edwards joined an emerging group of writers who had success self-publishing their work. Edwards and Voss self-published their first novel, Killing Cupid, on Kindle Direct Publishing, which eventually climbed to the Top 100 on the Kindle charts. That same year, the pair published Catch your Death, which at one point was selling 1,000 copies a day. In a few months, the books were number one and two in the best-sellers’ list and the pair was the first self-publishing British authors to reach the top spot on Amazon. The acclaim earned them TV appearances and a four-book deal with HarperCollins, and an advance of roughly £50,000 each. During an interview with The Guardian in 2013, Edwards said self-publishing on Amazon can be advantageous for emerging writers who don't yet have publishers but are ready to seek out a wider audience.

Novels 

 Killing Cupid with Louise Voss (2012)
 Forward Slash with Louise Voss (2013)
 What You Wish For (2014)
 Because She Loves Me (2014)
 Follow You Home (2015)
 The Devil's Work (2016)
 The Lucky Ones (2017)
 The Retreat (2018)
 In Her Shadow (2018)
 Here to Stay (2019)
 The House Guest (2020)
 The Hollows (2021)
 No Place to Run (2022)

Influences 
Edwards has said he is a fan of American authors, including Stephen King who influenced the kind of stories he likes to tell: "Extraordinary, often scary, things happening to ordinary people." The works of both Harlan Coben and Linwood Barclay influenced Edwards when he wrote No Place to Run. Edwards has also been influenced by the United States, especially California where inspiration from a rail-and-road trip shaped the environmental themes of his novel No Place to Run.

Personal 
Edwards currently lives in Wolverhampton with his wife and their children. Edwards is represented by Madeleine Milburn.

References

Living people
1970 births
English writers